Louis-Pierre Cécile (January 15, 1905 – February 19, 1995) was an Ontario lawyer and political figure. He represented Prescott in the Legislative Assembly of Ontario from 1948 to 1967 as a Progressive Conservative member.

He was born in Tecumseh, Ontario in 1905, the son of Arthur-Lewis Cécile, and studied at the Université de Montréal and Osgoode Hall. In 1941, he married Fabienne Gascon. He was chairman of the Secondary School Board for Hawkesbury. He ran unsuccessfully for a seat in the federal parliament in 1945. Cécile was Minister of Travel and Publicity in the provincial cabinet from 1949 to 1955 and Minister of Public Welfare from 1955 to 1966.

Cabinet positions

References

Further reading
 Histoire des Comtes Unis de Prescott et de Russell, L. Brault (1963)

External links 

1905 births
1995 deaths
Progressive Conservative Party of Ontario MPPs
Franco-Ontarian people
People from Hawkesbury, Ontario